Alexander Yurai Tadevosyan (born 9 August 1980) is a retired Armenian football defender. He was a member of the Armenia national team, and has participated in 40 international matches since his debut in an away friendly match against Andorra on 7 June 2002.

National team statistics

External links 

Living people
1980 births
Footballers from Tbilisi
Armenian footballers
Association football defenders
Armenia international footballers
Armenian expatriate footballers
Expatriate footballers in Iran
Expatriate footballers in Belarus
Expatriate footballers in Lebanon
Armenian Premier League players
FC Ararat Yerevan players
FC Pyunik players
Bargh Shiraz players
FC Vitebsk players
FC Mika players
Al Ahed FC players
Armenian expatriate sportspeople in Lebanon
Lebanese Premier League players